Andrew Fish is a professional disc golfer, former civil engineer, and collegiate ultimate frisbee player from Baltimore, Maryland. Fish joined the Professional Disc Golf Association in 2013, and became a professional in 2013.

Professional career 
Fish was a civil engineer for Baltimore County, Maryland, specializing in environmental engineering and water resources until 2022.

Professional disc golf career

College 
Fish began playing disc golf in college, with the Georgia Tech Disc Golf Team, competing in the 2013 National Collegiate Disc Golf Championship, where he finished in ninth place.

Professional 
In 2022, Fish transitioned to being a full time touring disc golf professional.

Fish's notable wins include, the 2018, 2019, and 2021 Warwick Disc Golf Championship, 2021 New Jersey State Championship, 2018 Stafford Open, 2017 Delaware Disc Golf Challenge, the 2016, 2017, 2018 and 2019 Seneca Creek Soiree, 2019 Firefly Hollow Open, and 2015 Eric Yetter Champions Cup.

Since June 2013, he has only missed cashing at a professional tournament twice, at the 2013 Madisonville Open, and the 2015 United States Disc Golf Championship.

Since 2017, alongside Allie Stone, Fish has directed the Women's Open of Maryland.

In 150 career PDGA tournaments, Fish has accumulated 53 wins and $64,783 in winnings.

Sponsorship and equipment 
In 2020, Fish resigned with sponsor Discraft for a fifth season with the disc manufacturer, and maintains a bag sponsorship with Upper Park Disc Golf. He commonly carries the following discs in competition:

Drivers

 Thrasher
 Crank
 Flick
 Force
 Nuke OS
 Raptor
 Undertaker (Z)
 Vulture

Midranges

 Comet (ESP)
 Wasp

Putters

 Zone
 Challenger
 Roach (Soft X)

Ultimate career

College 
Fish played college ultimate at Georgia Institute of Technology, beginning in the 2007-08 season, playing for five seasons. As a graduate student, he was named to the Southeast All-Region second team by USA Ultimate in 2012.

References 

American disc golfers
Living people
Year of birth missing (living people)

People from Baltimore County, Maryland
American civil engineers
Georgia Tech alumni
Ultimate (sport) players